Vysoky (masculine), Vysokaya (feminine), or Vysokoye (neuter) may refer to:
Vysoky (lower stratovolcano)
Vysoky (higher stratovolcano)
Vysoky (inhabited locality) (Vysokaya, Vysokoye), several inhabited localities in Russia
Vysokaya Mount, a mountain in the Middle Urals in Sverdlovsk Oblast, Russia
Vysokaye, a town in Brest Oblast, Belarus